Uraan may refer to the following television series from Pakistan:

 Uraan (2010 TV series)
 Uraan (2019 TV series)
 Uraan (2020 TV series)